Rose is the color halfway between red and magenta on the HSV color wheel, also known as the RGB color wheel.

Rose is one of the tertiary colors on the HSV color wheel. The complementary color of rose is spring green. Sometimes rose is quoted instead as the web-safe color FF00CC, which is closer to magenta than to red, corresponding to a hue angle near 320 degrees, or the web-safe color FF0077, which is closer to red than magenta, corresponding to a hue angle of about 340 degrees.

Variations of rose

Lavender blush

This is the web color lavender blush. It is a very pale shade of rose.

Misty rose

Misty rose is a pale shade of rose. It is also a web color.

Tickle me pink

The color tickle me pink was formulated by Crayola in 1993.

Persian pink

Since the color rose is so well loved in Persia (Iran), some shades of rose are named after Persia, such as the light tone of rose of this color called Persian pink. This color is very popular in women's fashion.

The first recorded use of Persian pink as a color name in English was in 1922.

Rose pink

The first recorded use of rose pink as a color name in English was in 1760.

Rose bonbon

The name rose bonbon translates loosely from French into English as candy rose or candy pink, or more specifically as bonbon rose or bonbon pink – presumably referring to bonbons that are coated with icing that is colored rose bonbon.

Rose bonbon is a tone of rose that is popular in France.

Brilliant rose

The color brilliant rose is a Crayola color formulated in 1949, but the name was changed in 1958 to magenta.

The original name is more accurate since this color, having a hue code of 329, is much closer to rose than (web color) magenta.

Thulian pink

The color Thulian pink is also called Thulite pink; the first recorded use of Thulite pink as a color name in English was in 1912.

The term Thulian pink refers to the land of Thule.

Another name for this color is first lady. The first use of first lady as a color name in English was in 1948 when the Plochere Color System, (a color system that is widely used by interior designers) was inaugurated in 1948.

The hex code for Thulian pink is identical to that of China pink and Liseran purple.

French rose

The color French rose is also called France rose.

The first recorded use of France rose as a color name in English was in 1926.

Color sample of French rose—this color matches exactly the color sample shown as "France rose" in the 1930 book by Maerz and Paul A Dictionary of Color.

Razzmatazz

The color Razzmatazz is a rich shade of crimson-rose.

Razzmatazz was a new Crayola crayon color chosen in 1993 as a part of the Name The New Colors Contest.

It was named by then 5-year-old Laura Bartolomei-Hill. She was the youngest winner of Crayola's "Name the New Colors Contest."

Razzle dazzle rose

The color razzle dazzle rose is a vivid tone of rose tending toward magenta.

The color razzle dazzle rose was named by Crayola in 1990. Before that, from its formulation in 1972 to 1990, it had been named hot magenta.

Persian rose

The first recorded use of Persian rose as a color name in English was in 1921.

This color matches the color of the Persian rose color sample in A Dictionary of Color—a highly saturated color close to the outer surface of the color sphere, just below the equator of the color sphere, about halfway between rose and magenta.  The color Persian rose may also be described as a color close to the purple boundary of the CIE chromaticity diagram about halfway between rose and magenta.

Fuchsia rose

Fuchsia rose is the color that was chosen as the 2001 Pantone color of the year by Pantone.

The source of this color is the "Pantone Textile Paper eXtended (TPX)" color list, color #17-2031 TPX—Fuchsia rose.

Rose red 

The source of rose red is the "Pantone Textile Paper eXtended (TPX)" color list, color #18-1852 TPX—Rose red.

Telemagenta

The color telemagenta is one of the colors in the RAL color matching system, a color system widely used in Europe.  The RAL color list first originated in 1927, and it reached its present form in 1961.

Dogwood rose

The color dogwood rose is sometimes called dogwood red. Dogwood rose in nature:

Raspberry rose

This is the color raspberry rose.

China rose

The color China rose is a deep tone of rose.

The first recorded use of China rose as a color name in English was in 1925.

Folly

This is the color Folly.

Ruby

Ruby is a color that is a representation of the color of the cut and polished ruby gemstone. Ruby as a color is more akin to rose than red.

Liseran purple

The first recorded use of liseran purple as a color name in English was in 1912.

Pearly purple

Pearly purple is one of the colors in the special set of metallic colored Crayola crayons called Silver Swirls, the colors of which were formulated by Crayola in 1990.

Mulberry

The color mulberry is a representation of the color of mulberry jam or pie. This was a Crayola crayon color from 1958 to 2003.

The first recorded use of mulberry as a color name in English was in 1776.

French (Canada) Rose

French (Canada) rose is one of the brilliant raspberry color.

See also
Amaranth (color)
Cerise (color)
Fuchsia (color)
Toulouse: "La Ville rose"
List of colors

References

External links
ISCC-NBS Dictionary of Color Names (1955) – Color dictionary used by stamp collectors to identify the colors of stamps – See sample of the color [Dark] Persian rose (color sample #254) displayed on indicated page.
ISCC-NBS Dictionary of Color Names (1955) – Color Sample of Tea rose (color sample #28)

Tertiary colors